Iliyan Marchev (born 9 September 1992) is a Bulgarian footballer who plays as a defender for Hebar Pazardzhik .

References

External links
 

1992 births
Living people
Bulgarian footballers
First Professional Football League (Bulgaria) players
FC Hebar Pazardzhik players
PFC Lokomotiv Plovdiv players
PFC Pirin Gotse Delchev players
FC Botev Vratsa players

Association football defenders
People from Asenovgrad